This is a list of earthquakes in 1965. Only magnitude 6.0 or greater earthquakes appear on the list. Lower magnitude events are included if they have caused death, injury or damage. Events which occurred in remote areas will be excluded from the list as they would not have generated significant media interest. All dates are listed according to UTC time. Maximum intensities are indicated on the Mercalli intensity scale and are sourced from United States Geological Survey (USGS) ShakeMap data. A fairly busy year with 18 magnitude 7.0+ events. Two of these were above magnitude 8 and struck within 10 days of each other. The largest of the year was a magnitude 8.7 which struck the Rat Islands, Alaska in February. No deaths were reported from this event. New Hebrides had a series of destructive events in August. Of the 667 deaths in 1965, most came from an event in Chile in March which had 400 fatalities.

Overall

By death toll 

 Note: At least 10 casualties

By magnitude 

 Note: At least 7.0 magnitude

Notable events

January

February

March

April

May

June

July

August

September

October

November

December

References

1965
 
1965